The ABC Champions Cup 1996 was the 7th staging of the ABC Champions Cup, the basketball club tournament of Asian Basketball Confederation. The tournament was held in Manila, Philippines between June 2 to 9, 1996.

Preliminary round

Group A

Group B

Final round

Semifinals

3rd place

Final

Final standing

Awards
Most Valuable Player:  Tony Harris (Hapee Toothpaste)

References
FIBA Asia

1996
1995–96 in Asian basketball
1996 in Philippine basketball
International basketball competitions hosted by the Philippines